Kongchai Chanaidonmuang is a Thai Muay Thai fighter. He trained under Sangtiennoi Sor.Rungroj at Tor.Sangtiennoi gym in the North of Pathum Thani Province and fights under the banner of the OneSongchai promotion.

Biography 
Kongchai was born in the Prakhon Chai District of Buriram Province. He started boxing at 10 years old and started fighting soon after. Originally called Kongsiam, he later changed his ring name to Kongchai.

Titles and accomplishments
ONE Championship
Performance of the Night (One time) 
Rajadamnern Stadium
2020 Rajadamnern Stadium 115 lbs Champion
Thanakorn Stadium
2020 Thanakorn Stadium 122 lbs Champion
Jitmuangnon Stadium (Or.Tor.Gor.3 Stadium)
2022 Jitmuangnon 126 lbs Champion

Fight record

|-  style="background:#cfc;"
| 2023-03-03|| Win ||align=left| Chalamkhao P.K.Saenchai || ONE Friday Fights 7, Lumpinee Stadium || Bangkok, Thailand || Decision (Unanimous) || 3 ||3:00
|-  style="background:#cfc;"
| 2023-02-03 || Win||align=left| Kritpetch P.K.Saenchai || ONE Friday Fights 3, Lumpinee Stadium || Bangkok, Thailand|| KO (Body kick)|| 1 || 1:15

|-  style="background:#fbb;"
| 2022-12-25 || Loss ||align=left| Apiwat SorJor.OleyYasothon || Muaydee VitheeThai + Jitmuangnon, Or.Tor.Gor3 Stadium || Nonthaburi province, Thailand|| Decision || 5 || 3:00

|-  style="background:#c5d2ea;"
| 2022-11-18 || Draw ||align=left| Diesellek BuildJC || Ruamponkon + Prachin || Prachinburi province, Thailand || Decision (Split)|| 5 ||3:00

|-  style="text-align:center; background:#cfc;"
| 2022-10-06 || Win ||align=left| Kaito Wor.Wanchai || Petchyindee, Rajadamnern Stadium || Bangkok, Thailand ||Decision || 5 ||3:00

|-  style="background:#cfc;"
| 2022-09-04 || Win ||align=left| Apiwat SorJor.OleyYasothon || Muaydee VitheeThai + Jitmuangnon, Or.Tor.Gor3 Stadium || Nonthaburi province, Thailand|| Decision (Split)|| 5 ||3:00
|-
! style=background:white colspan=9 |

|-  style="background:#fbb;"
| 2022-07-27 || Loss||align=left| Saenson Erawan || Muay Thai Chalermprakiat + Yod Muay Mahachon ||Nonthaburi province, Thailand||Decision || 5|| 3:00

|-  style="background:#cfc;"
| 2022-07-03 || Win||align=left| Pornpitak SorTor.TanomsriBangpu || Muaydee VitheeThai + Jitmuangnon, Or.Tor.Gor3 Stadium ||Nonthaburi province, Thailand|| Decision ||5 ||3:00 

|- style="background:#cfc;"
|2022-06-04 || Win|| align="left" | Superlek Jitmuangnon  || Jaomuaythai, Siam Omnoi Stadium ||Samut Sakhon, Thailand|| Decision || 5 ||3:00

|- style="background:#c5d2ea;"
|2022-05-07 || Draw|| align="left" | Petchtawee Sor.PhongAmorn ||Jitmuangnon Super Fight, Or.Tor.Gor3 Stadium ||Nonthaburi province, Thailand|| Decision|| 5 ||3:00 

|-  style="background:#cfc;"
| 2022-04-16|| Win ||align=left| Petchthong NayokwitThungSong || Jitmuangnon Super Fight, Or.Tor.Gor.3 Stadium || Nonthaburi Province, Thailand ||TKO (Punches) || 3 || 
|-  style="background:#cfc;"
| 2022-03-20|| Win||align=left| Petchpadriew SorJor.Vichitmuangpadriew || MuayDeeVithitai + Jitmuangnon, Or.Tor.Gor.3 Stadium || Nonthaburi Province, Thailand || Decision|| 5 ||3:00 

|-  style="background:#fbb;"
| 2022-02-20|| Loss||align=left| Petchthong NayokwitThungSong || MuayDeeVithitai + Jitmuangnon, Or.Tor.Gor.3 Stadium || Nonthaburi Province, Thailand || Decision || 5 ||3:00 
|-
! style=background:white colspan=9 |
|-  style="background:#cfc;"
| 2021-12-19|| Win ||align=left| Phethuahin Sor.Prawatmuang || MuayDeeVithitai + Jitmuangnon, Or.Tor.Gor.3 Stadium || Nonthaburi Province, Thailand || TKO (Punches & Knees) || 3 || 
|-  style="background:#cfc;"
| 2021-11-14|| Win ||align=left| Chalamdam NayokwitThungSong || MuayDeeVithitai + Jitmuangnon, Or.Tor.Gor.3 Stadium || Nonthaburi Province, Thailand || Decision  || 5 || 3:00
|-  style="background:#fbb;"
| 2021-04-17|| Loss||align=left| Superlek Jitmuangnon || SuekJaoMuayThai, Siam Omnoi Stadium|| Samut Prakan, Thailand || KO (Right Elbow)  || 2 ||
|-  style="background:#fbb;"
| 2021-03-12|| Loss||align=left| Saksri Kiatmoo9 || Muaymanwansuk, Rangsit Stadium || Rangsit, Thailand || Decision  || 5 || 3:00
|-  style="background:#fbb;"
| 2020-11-14|| Loss||align=left| Superlek Jitmuangnon ||  Jitmuangnon + Sor.CafeMuayThai, OrTorGor.3 Stadium || Nonthaburi Province, Thailand || Decision (split)  || 5 || 3:00
|-  style="background:#cfc;"
| 2020-09-26|| Win ||align=left| Yodpanom Por.Petchkaikaew || OneSongchai, Thanakorn Stadium || Nakhon Pathom Province, Thailand || Decision || 5 || 3:00 
|-
! style=background:white colspan=9 |
|-  style="background:#c5d2ea;"
| 2020-08-25|| Draw||align=left| Watcharapon PKsaenchaiMuayThai || Chef Boontham, Thanakorn Stadium|| Nakhon Pathom Province, Thailand || Decision || 5 || 3:00
|-  style="background:#fbb;"
| 2020-07-25|| Loss ||align=left| Wanmawin Pumpanmuang || Yodmuay Onesongchai, Thanakorn Stadium|| Nakhon Pathom Province, Thailand || KO (Right Elbow)|| 2 ||
|-  style="background:#cfc;"
| 2020-03-05|| Win||align=left| Puenkon Tor.Surat || Rajadamnern Stadium || Bangkok, Thailand || Decision || 5 || 3:00
|-  style="background:#cfc;"
| 2020-01-30|| Win ||align=left| Phetsuphan Por.Daorungruang || Rajadamnern Stadium || Bangkok, Thailand || Decision || 5 || 3:00 
|-
! style=background:white colspan=9 |
|-  style="background:#cfc;"
| 2019-12-12|| Win ||align=left| Yodpetch AnnyMuayThai || Rajadamnern Stadium || Bangkok, Thailand || TKO (Punches & Elbows) || 2 ||
|-  style="background:#cfc;"
| 2019-11-07|| Win ||align=left| Phichitchai Sor.ChatchaiGym || Rajadamnern Stadium || Bangkok, Thailand || TKO (Punches) || 4 ||
|-  style="background:#cfc;"
| 2019-09-30|| Win ||align=left| Paruhatlek Muangsima || Rajadamnern Stadium || Bangkok, Thailand ||  Decision || 5 || 3:00
|-  style="background:#cfc;"
| 2019-08-17|| Win ||align=left| Paruhatlek Muangsima || Thanakorn Stadium || Nakhon Pathom Province, Thailand ||  Decision || 5 || 3:00
|-  style="background:#cfc;"
| 2019-06-06|| Win ||align=left| Fahlan Por.Petchkaikaew || Rajadamnern Stadium || Bangkok, Thailand || KO (Left High Kick) || 4 ||
|-  style="background:#cfc;"
| 2019-04-22|| Win ||align=left| Maoklee Petchsimuen || Rajadamnern Stadium || Bangkok, Thailand || Decision || 5 || 3:00
|-  style="background:#cfc;"
| 2019-03-26|| Win ||align=left| Yodpanom Por.Petchkaikaew || Lumpinee Stadium || Bangkok, Thailand || KO (Left Elbow)|| 4 ||
|-  style="background:#fbb;"
| 2019-02-28|| Loss ||align=left| Maoklee Petchsimuen || Rajadamnern Stadium || Bangkok, Thailand || Decision || 5 || 3:00
|-  style="background:#cfc;"
| 2018-12-27|| Win ||align=left| Rungnara Rattanaphanu || Rajadamnern Stadium || Bangkok, Thailand || KO (Left Cross)|| 3 || 0:07
|-  style="background:#cfc;"
| 2018-11-05|| Win ||align=left| Tongsabat Or.NokkaewMuayThai || Rajadamnern Stadium || Bangkok, Thailand || Decision || 5 || 3:00
|-  style="background:#fbb;"
| 2018-08-30|| Loss||align=left| Tongsabat Or.NokkaewMuayThai ||  || Thailand || Decision || 5 || 3:00
|-  style="background:#cfc;"
| 2018-06-03|| Win ||align=left| Liempetch Lookphayalithai || Channel 5 Stadium || Thailand || Decision || 5 || 3:00
|-  style="background:#cfc;"
| 2018-04-22|| Win ||align=left| Sudsakorn Sitnayokmoht || Rangsit Stadium ||Rangsit, Thailand|| Decision || 5 || 3:00
|-  style="background:#cfc;"
| 2018-01-28|| Win ||align=left| Numphibun Por.Prakan||  || Thailand || KO || 4 ||
|-  style="background:#fbb;"
| 2017-07-30|| Loss||align=left| Thanachat Sor.Jullasen || Rangsit Stadium || Thailand || Decision || 5 || 3:00
|-  style="background:#cfc;"
| 2017-06-16|| Win ||align=left| Khunsah Or.Bor.Tor.Boonthun || Lumpinee Stadium || Bangkok, Thailand || Decision || 5 || 3:00
|-  style="background:#fbb;"
| 2017-04-30|| Loss||align=left| Kumchai Sor.Pongamon || Rangsit Stadium || Thailand || Decision || 5 || 3:00
|-  style="background:#fbb;"
| 2017-01-03|| Loss||align=left| Kumchai Sor.Pongamon || Lumpinee Stadium || Bangkok, Thailand || Decision || 5 || 3:00
|-  style="background:#cfc;"
| 2016-12-04|| Win||align=left| Romphalang Por.Boonsit || Rangsit Stadium || Rangsit, Thailand|| Decision || 5 || 3:00
|-
| colspan=9 | Legend:

References

Kongchai Chanaidonmuang
ONE Championship kickboxers 
Living people
2002 births
Kongchai Chanaidonmuang